Justice Roberts is the name of:

John Roberts (born 1955), chief justice of the United States Supreme Court (2005-present)
Owen Roberts (1875–1955), associate justice of the United States Supreme Court (1930–1945)
B. K. Roberts (1907–1999), associate justice of the Florida Supreme Court
Betty Roberts (1923–2011), associate justice of the Oregon Supreme Court
Clarence J. Roberts (1873–1931), associate justice of the New Mexico Supreme Court
David G. Roberts (1928–1999), associate justice of the Maine Supreme Judicial Court
Denys Roberts (1923–2013), last non-Chinese chief justice appointed to the Supreme Court of Hong Kong
Oran Milo Roberts (1815–1898), associate justice and later chief justice of the Texas Supreme Court
Samuel J. Roberts (1907–1987), associate justice of the Supreme Court of Pennsylvania
Thomas H. Roberts (1902-1976), associate justice and chief justice of the Rhode Island Supreme Court (1955-1976)